Aradippou ( []) is a town and municipality in Cyprus, located on the outskirts of the city of Larnaca. It was established in 1986 following a referendum of local residents. It has a population of approximately 20,000. After it received town status, Aradippou defined its municipal limits and is now the second-largest municipality of Cyprus as it extends over an area of 42,982 square governmental acres.

Twinned cities
 Neapolis, Greece (since 2001)
 Mouresi, Greece

Football clubs
 Ermis Aradippou
 Omonia Aradippou

References

Municipalities in Larnaca District